WGM may refer to:
 Weil, Gotshal & Manges, a law firm based in New York city
 West Glamorgan, preserved county in Wales, Chapman code
 Woman Grandmaster, a high-ranking women's chess title
 World Gospel Mission, a Christian missionary agency headquartered in Marion, Indiana
 We Got Married, a South Korean reality show
 Workgroup Manager, a software program bundled as part of Mac OS X Server
 WGM (radio station), an Atlanta, Georgia radio station that operated from March 1922 to July 1923.